Palmerstown is a suburban area of Dublin, Ireland.

Palmerstown may also refer to:
 Palmerstown, Fingal, a civil parish in Ireland
 Palmerstown, Vale of Glamorgan, a district in south Wales
 Palmerstown, U.S.A., a 1980s American TV show

See also
 Palmerston (disambiguation)